Paul F. Nichols (born October 27, 1952, Kingston, Pennsylvania) is a former delegate to the Virginia General Assembly. A Democrat, he was elected to the Virginia House of Delegates in November 2007.

He represented the 51st district in Prince William County. He was defeated for reelection on November 3, 2009.

References

External links
 (Constituent/campaign website)

Project Vote Smart - Representative Paul F. Nichols (VA) profile
Washington Post - Paul F. Nichols local election 2008 profile}

Democratic Party members of the Virginia House of Delegates
Virginia lawyers
1952 births
Living people
King's College (Pennsylvania) alumni
Antonin Scalia Law School alumni
People from Prince William County, Virginia
People from Kingston, Pennsylvania
21st-century American politicians